During the 2008–09 season Cowdenbeath competed in the Scottish Third Division, Scottish Cup, Scottish League Cup and the Challenge Cup.

Summary
Cowdenbeath finished second in the Third Division, entering the play-offs losing 5–4 on penalties to Stenhousemuir. Following Livingston's demotion after going into Administration, Cowdenbeath were promoted to the Second Division. They reached the second round of the Scottish Cup, the second round of the League Cup and were eliminated in the Quarter-finals of the Challenge Cup.

Management
For season 2008–09 Cowdenbeath were managed by Danny Lennon, following the sacking of Brian Welsh in the summer.

Results & fixtures

Scottish Third Division

Second Division play-offs

Challenge Cup

League Cup

Scottish Cup

League table

Player statistics

Squad 

|}
a.  Includes other competitive competitions, including playoffs and the Scottish Challenge Cup.

References

Cowdenbeath
Cowdenbeath F.C. seasons